Nassarius harryleei is a species of sea snail, a marine gastropod mollusc in the family Nassariidae, the Nassa mud snails or dog whelks. It is named for shell collector Harry Lee.

Description
The shell grows to a length of 4 mm.

Distribution
This marine species occurs in the Pacific Ocean off Panama.

References

External links
 

Nassariidae
Gastropods described in 2001